Jan Lityński (Warsaw, 18 January 1946 – Pułtusk, 21 February 2021) was a Polish politician, journalist, and opposition activist. He was a Deputy between 1989 and 2001.

References

1946 births
2021 deaths
Polish journalists
Polish politicians
People from Warsaw
Members of the Polish Sejm 1991–1993
Members of the Polish Sejm 1993–1997
Members of the Polish Sejm 1997–2001